Yinzhen Subdistrict is a subdistrict in Daozhen Gelao and Miao Autonomous County, Zunyi, Guizhou, China.

Etymology
The name of "Yinzhen" is named after Yin Zhen, a Confucian scholar who lived during the Eastern Han dynasty (25–220) and was one of "Three Sages of Han in Guizhou", the other two were She Ren and Sheng Lan. The name of "Daozhen (Gelao and Miao Autonomous County)" is also named after his courtesy name "Daozhen".

Administrative division
As of 2016, the subdistrict is divided into one village and three communities:
Xincheng Community
Yongcheng Community
East Street Community
Sangmuba

Economy
The town's economy is based on business.

References

Subdistricts of Zunyi